Murphree is a surname. Notable people with the surname include:

Albert A. Murphree (1870–1927), American college professor and university president
Dennis Murphree (1886–1949), Mississippi politician
Eger V. Murphree (1898–1962), American chemist, known for his co-invention of the process of fluid catalytic cracking
Thomas Alexander Murphree (1883–1945), United States federal judge

See also
Murphree Area, historic residence hall complex on the University of Florida campus in Gainesville, Florida
Murphree Hall, historic student residence building on the University of Florida campus in Gainesville, Florida
Morph (disambiguation)
Murfree
Murph (disambiguation)
Murphy